Hypsopygia iwamotoi is a species of snout moth in the genus Hypsopygia. It is found in the Russian Far East and Korea.

The wingspan is 11–18 mm. The ground colour of the forewings is purplish red, scattered with blackish scales and yellow spots and lines. The hindwings are purplish red. Adults are on wing from July to August.

References

Moths described in 1995
Pyralini